This is a list of airlines currently operating in Slovakia.

Charter airlines

Government airlines

Air rescue

See also
 List of airlines
 List of defunct airlines of Slovakia

Slovakia
Airlines
Airlines
Slovakia